Craig W. Chenery is a British-American author, screenwriter and artist with a particular interest in the dark humor, zombie, horror, comedy, pop culture, Star Wars and special effects genres.

Writing 

Craig W. Chenery is the author of Blood Splatter: A Guide to Cinematic Zombie Violence, Gore and Special Effects. It is a study of the zombie genre as defined by gore and special effects. Chenery interviewed genre professionals, including Greg Nicotero, Tom Savini, John Russo and Lloyd Kaufman of Troma Entertainment.

Chenery is the co-author of the Butch G. Cat series of children's novels children's book series. The first two books in the series were released in late 2012 and book three was released September 2013. As of 2014, these books are out of print.

In 2014, Chenery released the bestselling The Comicon and Convention Survival Guide. It is an in-depth study of the logistics behind attending pop culture events. The second edition followed in October 2015. He has also contributed stories and articles to numerous horror and Steampunk anthologies and magazines.

In 2019, Chenery finished the long-in-development novel God Just Wanted to Play Golf, the first book in The Oceanview Trilogy.  Lucifer Just Wanted To Pet Kittens book two in the series, was released December 2022. Chenery is currently working on book three tentatively titled Death Just Wanted To Eat Waffles.

In 2019, Chenery started writing the screenplay for "Dr. Saville's Horror Show". The movie was filmed in 2019 and 2020, and is scheduled for release Spring 2023.

Bibliography

Books

Comic Books

Screenplays

Public appearances 

Chenery has been interviewed by numerous podcasts and radio shows on a variety of subjects related to horror, special effects and science fiction.

In 2012, Chenery was invited to present at Phoenix Comicon on the evolution of special effects in zombie cinema. In 2013, Phoenix Comicon invited Chenery to present new panels, including A Visual History of Zombie Cinema and a ten-year retrospect of cult classic, Shaun of the Dead. Chenery was also a guest judge at the Zombie Beauty Pageant. Chenery has been a staple presenter at the event, and continues to present.

He was also a guest at the Rapture Horror Expo in October 2012 and 2013. Chenery was a guest author at Phoenix FearCon VII in 2015, VIII in 2019 and X in 2021. In 2017, he was a guest presenter at Westercon.

Filmography

Film

Other acting
Chenery is also a member of The Gentleman's Club Comedy Improv troupe. The troupe is Arizona's only long form three-man monoscene Improv Troupe and were nominated for Arizona's Best Comedy or Improv Troupe two years running. The Gentleman's Club performed monthly at Club Mardis Gras in Scottsdale, and Space 55 in Phoenix. In 2010, they appeared at the Phoenix Improv Festival. He has also performed with The Phoenix Neutrino Project where he both acted and scored the live soundtrack on numerous improvised live movies.

Art

In January 2017, Chenery debuted his latest project called "Comicones". Comicones is an art design project that presents a playful look at pop culture characters, including Disney, Star Wars, DC Comics, Marvel Comic, Doctor Who and many more.  He has also included celebrities including Tommy Wiseau and Weird Al Yankovic. At present, Chenery has created over 1000 characters. In his words "Comicones is a celebration of equality, but also of uniqueness". Comicones is an official licensee of Jay and Silent Bob, Star Trek, Shaun of the Dead, Adventure time, and Rick and Morty. Chenery is working on more official licensing for the brand.

Critical reception 

Chenery's work has been positively reviewed by numerous print publications such as Fangoria Magazine, Rue Morgue Magazine, Gore Noir Magazine, Ultra Violent Magazine, Z Magazine, Stiff Magazine, and genre websites such as Dread Central and Bloody Disgusting. Issue 312 of Fangoria called Blood Splatter "A Must Have".

Awards and nominations 

2023 – Worldwide Women's Film Festival. "Dr. Saville's Horror Show" – Best Horror Movie
2022 – Boden International Film Festival. "Dr. Saville's Horror Show" – Official Selection
2022 – Worldwide Women's Film Festival. "Dr. Saville's Horror Show" – Official Selection
2022 – Budapest Best International Film Festival. "Dr. Saville's Horror Show" – Official Selection
2022 – Sweden Film Festival. "Dr. Saville's Horror Show" – Official Selection
2022 – Tucson Terrorfest. "Dr. Saville's Horror Show" – Best Arizona Horror Film. 
2022 – Scream Queen Film Festival. "Dr. Saville's Horror Show" – Official Selection
2022 – Reel Screen Film Fest (Bristol England). "Dr. Saville's Horror Show" – Official Selection
2022 – Tokyo Film Awards. "Dr. Saville's Horror Show" – Best Horror Film. 
2022 – Tokyo Film Awards. "Dr. Saville's Horror Show" – Official Selection. 
2022 – Thrills and Chills International Film Festival. "Dr. Saville's Horror Show" - Official selection.
2022 – Frights and Fears Horror Festival. "Dr. Saville's Horror Show" – Official Selection. 
2022 – Frights and Fears Horror Festival. "Dr. Saville's Horror Show" – Best Film. 
2022 – Frights and Fears Horror Festival. "Dr. Saville's Horror Show" – Best cast. 
2022 – Frights and Fears Horror Festival. "Dr. Saville's Horror Show" – Best kill.
2022 – Atlanta Horror Film Festival. "Dr. Saville's Horror Show" – Official Selection.
2022 – Tucson Terrorfest. "Dr. Saville's Horror Show" – Official Selection.
2019 – Maxy Awards. "God Just Wanted To Play Golf" – Best Independent Horror Novel. Runner up.
2013 – Dead Letter Awards. "Blood Splatter: A Guide to Cinematic Zombie Violence, Gore and Special Effects" – Best Horror Reference Book. Winner.
2011 – Arizona Republic Arizona's Best, "The Gentleman's Club" – Best Improv or Comedy Troupe. Nominee
2010 – Arizona Republic Arizona's Best, "The Gentleman's Club" – Best Improv or Comedy Troupe. Nominee

References

External links 

 
 
 Craig W. Chenery at the Internet Book List

1974 births
Living people